Suze is a French brand of bitters flavored with the roots of the plant gentian, normally drunk as an apéritif. The brand is owned by Pernod Ricard. It is yellow in color with an ABV of 15% across Europe and a version bottled at 20% for the British market.

History
Suze was first put on the market under the name of Picotin in 1889 on the occasion of the Paris World Fair by Ferdinand Moureaux, who had inherited his family's distillery in Maisons-Alfort. The name was changed to Suze in 1898 and might either be related to Moureaux' sister in law Susanne Jaspert or to the river Suze in Switzerland, where Moureaux is said to have bought the recipe in 1885 or 1914.

In 1912, Pablo Picasso depicted a bottle of Suze in his collage Verre et bouteille de Suze. Between the two World Wars, through intensive marketing (such as the sponsorship of the Tour de France in 1933) Suze became one of the most popular alcoholic drinks in France.

References

Alcoholic drink brands
Bitters
Pernod Ricard brands